Lewis Morris (1726–1798) was a signer of the United States Declaration of Independence.

Lewis Morris may also refer to:

 Lewis Morris (governor) (1671–1746), American colonial leader in New York and New Jersey
 Lewis Morris (speaker) (1698–1762), American judge, politician and landowner
 Lewis Morris (1701–1765), Welsh poet
 Lewis R. Morris (1760–1825), U.S. Representative from Vermont
 Lewis G. Morris (1808–1900), maritime advocate, sheep and cattle breeder
 Sir Lewis Morris (1833–1907), Welsh poet, academic and politician
 Lewis Gouverneur Morris (1882–1967), banker and social figure in New York and Newport society